Mia Krampl (born 21 July 2000) is a Slovenian sport climber. In 2019, she finished second in lead at the IFSC Climbing World Championships and qualified to compete at the 2020 Summer Olympic Games by finishing third at the IFSC Combined Qualifier in Toulouse. Krampl also has a pair of podium finishes at the IFSC World Youth Championships, as well as two gold and one bronze medal at the European Youth Championships.

Krampl started climbing at the age of six, as her brother was a competitive climber.

Competition highlights

IFSC Olympic qualifying
IFSC Combined Qualifier Toulouse 2019
Women combined: 3rd (qualified)

IFSC Climbing World Championships
 2019 IFSC Climbing World Championships (Hachioji)
 Women lead: 2nd
2021 IFSC Climbing World Championships (Moscow)
Women combined: 2nd

IFSC Climbing World Cup
 Bouldering 2019
 Munich: 3rd

IFSC Climbing European Championships
2019 IFSC Climbing European Championships (Edinburgh)
Women lead: 2nd

IFSC Climbing World Youth Championships
 2016 IFSC Youth World Championships (Guangzhou)
 Female Youth A lead: 2nd
 2015 IFSC Youth World Championships (Arco)
 Female Youth B lead: 2nd

European Youth Championships
2018 European Youth Championships (Brussels)
Female Juniors boulder: 1st
2016 European Youth Championships (Mitterdorg)
Female Youth A lead: 3rd
2016 European Youth Championships (Edinburgh)
Female Youth B lead: 1st

References

External links 

Living people
2000 births
Female climbers
Sportspeople from Kranj
Slovenian sportswomen
Slovenian rock climbers
Sport climbers at the 2020 Summer Olympics
Olympic sport climbers of Slovenia
21st-century Slovenian women
IFSC Climbing World Championships medalists